Hazel Glen was a historic home located near Port Penn, New Castle County, Delaware.  It was built  about 1859, and was a three-story, five bay, "L"-shaped brick dwelling with a brick rear wing. It had a low-hipped roof (once surmounted by a cupola, three-story porches, projecting eaves, and a simple box cornice in the Italianate-Revival style. It featured a three bay front entry porch with a flat roof supported by fluted Ionic columns.

It was listed on the National Register of Historic Places in 1978.  It was demolished sometime before 1991.

References

Houses on the National Register of Historic Places in Delaware
Italianate architecture in Delaware
Houses completed in 1859
Houses in New Castle County, Delaware
National Register of Historic Places in New Castle County, Delaware